Accidentally on Purpose is the third studio album by British country music duo The Shires. It was released on 20 April 2018 by Decca Records. The album was recorded in Nashville, Tennessee and produced by Lindsay Rimes.

Background
In an official statement through Universal Music, Earle and Rhodes stated about the album: "Accidentally on Purpose is full of personal songs that really sums up the whirlwind journey we've been on together. From the first day we met, we’ve been crazy dreamers with big plans, who really believed that Country could break into the UK mainstream. For all those dreams, we never imagined it would all happen so quickly and we're so proud and excited to be releasing our third album."

Track listing

Charts

References

2018 albums
The Shires (duo) albums
Decca Records albums
Albums produced by Lindsay Rimes